Silene aegyptiaca is a species of flowering plant in the family Caryophyllaceae. The common name for this species is Egyptian campion or Egyptian catchfly.

The species can be found across the Middle East.

References

aegyptiaca